Santa Clotilde (Portuguese for Saint Clotilde) is a village in the eastern part of São Tomé Island in São Tomé and Príncipe. Its population is 112 (2012 census). It lies 6 km west of Santana.

References

Populated places in Cantagalo District